A growth rate is said to be infra-exponential or subexponential if it is dominated by all exponential growth rates, however great the doubling time. A continuous function with infra-exponential growth rate will have a Fourier transform that is a Fourier hyperfunction.

Examples of sub-exponential growth rates arise in the analysis of algorithms, where they give rise to sub-exponential time complexity, and in the growth rate of groups, where a subexponential growth rate implies that a group is amenable.

References
Fourier hyperfunction in the Encyclopedia of Mathematics

Exponentials